The 1993–94 Croatian First Football League was the third season of the top football league in Croatia since its establishment.

Promoted teams 
Primorac Stobreč were promoted as winners of Druga HNL - South division and Dubrava were promoted as the winners of the Druga HNL - North division. The league was therefore expanded to 18 teams, since no relegation had taken place the previous season.

League table

Results

Top goalscorers

Trivia 
 Goran Vlaović of Croatia Zagreb scored five goals in Croatia's 10-1 win against Pazinka. He was also the top goalscorer of the season.
 Hajduk's 10-0 win against Radnik is the highest ever margin of victory achieved in Prva HNL.

See also 
 1993–94 Croatian Football Cup
 1993–94 Croatian Second Football League

References

External links 
 Table and results at Prva HNL official website 
 Table and results at RSSSF.com

1993-94
Cro
1993–94 in Croatian football